Gary Smith (born 25 March 1971) is a Scottish former professional footballer who played as a defender.

Career

Club career
Smith was born in Glasgow, Scotland. He began his professional career at Falkirk, making his debut in 1989. He was snapped up by Aberdeen in 1991 and played in three cup finals for the Dons. He scored an own goal in the 1992 Scottish League Cup Final, which ultimately led to Rangers winning the trophy.

In 1996, he left for French club Rennes (Heart of Midlothian winger Allan Johnston making the same move), before returning to Aberdeen in 1997. He signed for Hibernian in 2000 and despite falling out of favour with manager Franck Sauzée, re-established himself as a regular in the team under Bobby Williamson. After a solid spell at Hibs, Smith was allowed to leave Easter Road for Cowdenbeath in 2006. He was then loaned to Dundee from Cowdenbeath after he was passed over for the managerial position.

International career
Smith was called up to the senior Scotland squad by Andy Roxburgh in 1993 but was ultimately never capped at that level.

Honours
Falkirk
Scottish First Division: 1990–91

Aberdeen
Scottish League Cup: 1995; runners-up 1992

Scottish Cup: runners-up 1993

Hibernian
Scottish Cup: runners-up 2001
Scottish League Cup: runners-up 2004

References

External links
 
 

1971 births
Living people
Footballers from Glasgow
Scottish footballers
Association football defenders
Aberdeen F.C. players
Cowdenbeath F.C. players
Dundee F.C. players
Falkirk F.C. players
Hibernian F.C. players
Stade Rennais F.C. players
Scottish expatriate footballers
Expatriate footballers in France
Scottish Football League players
Ligue 1 players
Scottish Premier League players
Scottish expatriate sportspeople in France